The 2014–15 FC Mordovia Saransk season was Mordovia Saransk's 1st season back in the Russian Premier League, the highest tier of association football in Russia, following their promotion in 2014, and their 2nd season in total. Mordovia Saransk will also be taking part in the Russian Cup.

Squad

Out on loan

Transfers

Summer

In:

Out:

Winter

In:

Out:

Competitions

Russian Premier League

Results by round

Matches

League table

Russian Cup

Squad statistics

Appearances and goals

|-
|colspan="14"|Players away from the club on loan:

|-
|colspan="14"|Players who appeared for Mordovia Saransk no longer at the club:
|}

Goal scorers

Disciplinary record

Notes
 MSK time changed from UTC+4 to UTC+3 permanently on 26 October 2014.

References

FC Mordovia Saransk seasons
Mordovia Saransk